The first series of the British children's television series The Story of Tracy Beaker began broadcasting on 8 January 2002 on CBBC on BBC One and ended on 4 April 2002. The series follows the lives of the children living in the fictional children's care home of Stowey House, nicknamed by them "The Dumping Ground". It consists of twenty-six, fifteen-minute episodes. It is the first series in The Story of Tracy Beaker franchise.

Cast

Dani Harmer plays the title character, Tracy Beaker, while Montanna Thompson plays her arch-enemy Justine Littlewood. Justine's best friend, Louise Govern, is played by Chelsie Padley and a young boy that looks up to Tracy, Peter Ingham, is played by Joe Starrs. The eldest resident, Adele Azupadi, is played by Rochelle Gadd and the youngest resident, Maxy, is played by Jerome Holder. Sonny Muslim and Jay Haher play brothers Ryan and Zac Patterson. Nisha Nayar plays the residents' social worker, Elaine Boyak - nicknamed 'Elaine the Pain' by the children - and Clive Rowe plays Stowey House's chef, Norman 'Duke' Ellington. Sharlene Whyte and Connor Byrne play careworkers, Jenny Edwards and Mike Milligan, with Jenny being head care worker. Lisa Coleman plays Tracy's potential foster parent, Cam Lawson and Luke Youngblood plays Tracy's friend, Ben Batambuze, whom she befriends in the series premiere.

Main

Recurring

Guest

Episodes

Production
Cas Lester was the executive producer and Jane Dauncey was the producer for this series, and the filming took place in late 2001. Susan Tully and David Skynner directed an equal thirteen episodes each. Elly Brewer wrote nine episodes, Mary Morris wrote five episodes and Laura Summers wrote four episodes. Andy Walker and Arnold Evans wrote two episodes each and Carol Russell, Roger Griffiths, Othniel Smith and Graham Alborough all wrote one episode each. Brewer continued to write for Tracy Beaker franchise for another nine series, until the second series of The Dumping Ground, which is the second spin-off of The Story of Tracy Beaker.

Awards and nominations

Ratings

Schools repeats
In spring 2003, four episodes of Series 1 were repeated as part of BBC Two's weekday morning strand on educational programmes for schools. No episodes of subsequent series were shown in this block.

References

The Story of Tracy Beaker
2002 British television seasons